The Klein Grünhorn is a mountain of the Bernese Alps in Switzerland, situated north of the Gross Grünhorn in the canton of Valais.

References

External links
 Klein Grünhorn on Hikr

Mountains of the Alps
Alpine three-thousanders
Mountains of Switzerland
Mountains of Valais
Bernese Alps
Three-thousanders of Switzerland